The 1975 Stanford Cardinals football team represented Stanford University in the Pacific-8 Conference during the 1975 NCAA Division I football season. Led by fourth-year head coach Jack Christiansen, the Cardinals were 6–4–1 overall (5–2 in Pac-8, tie for third) and played home games on campus at Stanford Stadium in Stanford, California.

Schedule

Roster
WR Tony Hill

Game summaries

Michigan

Army

Mike Cordova 246 pass yds, 4 TD (sat out fourth quarter)
Don Stevenson 102 rush yds

References

Stanford
Stanford Cardinal football seasons
Stanford Cardinals football